David Gardiner Tyler (July 12, 1846 – September 5, 1927), was a U.S. Democratic Party politician and the ninth child and fourth son of John Tyler, the tenth President of the United States.

Although born in New York, he went to school in Virginia and fought in the Confederate Army during the American Civil War. After attending college in Germany and Virginia, he became a lawyer. He later served in the Virginia State Senate, as a member of the United States House of Representatives from Virginia's second congressional district, and as a Virginia Circuit Court judge.

Early life 
He was born in East Hampton, New York and was the first child born to former President John Tyler and his second wife, Julia Gardiner Tyler. He was named after his late maternal grandfather, David Gardiner. As a child, he attended private schools in Charles City County, Virginia.

In 1862, he entered present-day Washington and Lee University, where he was a member of Phi Kappa Psi fraternity, but dropped out the following year to fight in the Confederate Army during the American Civil War.  He was present at the surrender of Robert E. Lee at Appomattox Court House in 1865.  Following the war, he and his brother, John Alexander Tyler, traveled to Germany, and attended school in the Grand Duchy of Baden. He returned to the United States, and graduated from the Washington and Lee School of Law in 1869.

Career 
From 1870 to 1884, he practiced law in Richmond, Virginia, before accepting an appointment as Director of the state lunatic asylum in Williamsburg, Virginia, serving until 1887. From 1891 to 1892, he served in the Virginia State Senate, and on the Board of Visitors of the College of William and Mary.

Tyler was elected to the United States House of Representatives from the state's 2nd District, serving from 1893 to 1897. He was defeated for renomination in 1896, and returned to private law practice until his reelection to the state senate, where he served from 1900 to 1904. From 1904 until his death in 1927, he served as a state circuit court judge.

Elections

1892; Tyler was elected to the U.S. House of Representatives defeating Independent Republicans P.C. Garrigan and John F. Deyendorf, H.S. Collier, and Independent George Edwin Bowden, winning 55.61% of the vote.
1894; Tyler was re-elected defeating Republican Thomas R. Borland and Independent T.J. Edwards, winning 56.27% of the vote.

Personal life 
He was married to the former Mary Morris Jones (1865–1931). Together, they were the parents of five children, four of whom survived to adulthood:

 Mary Lyon Tyler (1895–1975), who married George Peterkin Gamble (1899–1986).
 Margaret Gardiner Tyler (1897–1981), who married Stephen F. Chadwick (1894–1975), grandson of Stephen F. Chadwick, the 5th Governor of Oregon.
 David Gardiner Tyler Jr. (1899–1993), who married Anne Morton Shelton (1900–1977).
 James Alfred Jones Tyler (1902–1972), who married Katherine Thomason (1909–1967).
 John Tyler (1905–1907), who died young.

He died at Sherwood Forest Plantation and is buried at Hollywood Cemetery in Richmond.

References

External links

1846 births
1927 deaths
American people of English descent
American people of Dutch descent
American people of Scottish descent
Burials at Hollywood Cemetery (Richmond, Virginia)
Children of presidents of the United States
Children of vice presidents of the United States
Confederate States Army soldiers
Democratic Party members of the United States House of Representatives from Virginia
Democratic Party Virginia state senators
Gardiner family
David Gardiner Tyler
Karlsruhe Institute of Technology alumni
Northern-born Confederates
People from Charles City County, Virginia
People from East Hampton (town), New York
Virginia circuit court judges
Virginia lawyers
Washington and Lee University School of Law alumni